The 1992–93 season was the 101st season in Liverpool F.C.'s existence, and their 31st consecutive year in the top-flight. Having won the FA Cup the previous season, Liverpool had qualified for the UEFA Cup Winners' Cup.

New members of the side for the 1992–93 season included goalkeeper David James, Hungarian midfielder István Kozma, Danish defender Torben Piechnik and attacking midfielder Paul Stewart. The close season had seen the departure of defender Barry Venison and winger Ray Houghton. A few weeks into the season, striker Dean Saunders also headed out of Anfield to sign for Aston Villa.

As founders members of the new FA Premier League, Liverpool finished sixth – a repeat of their performance in the previous season. But their failure to make an impact in the cup competitions meant that their season ended without a trophy and left them without any European football for the 1993–94 season.

This season covered the period from 1 July 1992 to 30 June 1993.

Players

First-team squad

Left club during season

Reserve squad

Transfers

In

Out

Match results

Pre-season

FA Charity Shield

Premier League

European Cup Winners' Cup

FA Cup

Football League Cup

Other games

Goalscorers

Season events

August
In the last season of the original Football League First Division before the creation of the FA Premier League, Liverpool had collected their fifth FA Cup but finished sixth in the league – the first time since 1981 that they hadn't finished champions or runners-up. They had returned to European competition in the UEFA Cup and reached the quarter-finals. Their disappointment in the league could largely be put down to the fact that key players Ian Rush and John Barnes had missed many games through injury. However, Rush and Barnes were back to full fitness for the 1992–93 season, accompanied by new signing Paul Stewart from Tottenham Hotspur, who could double as a midfielder or attacker, and 21-year-old Watford goalkeeper David James who was already an England under-21 international and widely tipped to be a full international over the next few years.

The season began on 8 August, when Liverpool faced league champions Leeds United in the FA Charity Shield, and an action packed game at Wembley Stadium ended in a 4–3 defeat. Eight days later, Liverpool travelled to the City Ground to take on Nottingham Forest in their very first Premier League game, but came away 1–0 losers after a Teddy Sheringham goal. Three days later, the Reds recorded their first win, goals and points at Anfield in a 2–1 win over Sheffield United, with Mark Walters opening the goalscoring followed by Paul Stewart in the second half. However, the visit of Arsenal to Anfield four days after that brought major disappointment as the North Londoners ran out 2–0 winners. The next two games (away visits to Ipswich Town and Leeds) both ended in 2–2 draws, with 70th minute penalties from Jan Molby in both of these games.

Liverpool's first month of the new Premier League had been a major disappointment, with one win, two draws and two defeats, leaving them a lowly 16th out of 22 clubs.

September
The second month of Liverpool's season was similar to the first – bringing one draw (at home to Southampton), one win (at home to Chelsea) and three defeats (at the hands of Sheffield United, Aston Villa and Wimbledon). They were now 19th in the league, with only goal difference keeping them out of relegation places at the end of the second month of a season in a league where they had been expected to challenge for the title, which was currently being contested by some of the most unlikely sides including Norwich City, Coventry City and Queen's Park Rangers as well as big spending Manchester United and Blackburn Rovers.

Liverpool's European adventure began on 16 September, with a 6–1 home demolition of Apollon Limassol (the Cypriot cup winners) in which Ian Rush scored four goals and Paul Stewart was on target twice in the first round first leg of the European Cup Winners' Cup. The return leg in Cyprus two weeks later saw Liverpool progress to the next stage with a 2–1 win thanks to another goal from Rush as well as another from Don Hutchison.

The Football League Cup quest began on 22 September, when Division Three Chesterfield gave the Reds a scare by drawing 4–4 with them at Anfield.

October
Liverpool's terrible start to the season gave way to a slight improvement in October. The month began well with a 1–0 home win over Sheffield Wednesday in which Don Hutchison scored the only goal, and two weeks later only a late equaliser from Mark Hughes denied them an away win over Manchester United, forcing a 2–2 draw. The following Saturday saw an impressive 4–1 home win over surprise title challengers Norwich, but the month ended with a return to Liverpool's losing ways as they were beaten 2–0 by Tottenham at White Hart Lane, where Spurs' first goal came from a spectacular volley by Nayim.

They ended the month in 14th place in the league – an improvement on the previous month but still well short of top spot.
Any hopes that Chesterfield might have had of achieving a giant killing feat over the Reds ended at Saltergate on 6 October, when Graeme Souness's men achieved a 4–1 win to put them through to the third round. They were drawn with Sheffield United, who held them to a goalless draw at Bramall Lane on 28 October,.

On the European scene, Liverpool's chances of glory in the Cup Winners' Cup took a severe blow when they were beaten 4–2 in Russia by Spartak Moscow.

November
Liverpool saw league action just three times in London – and won on each occasions. Middlesbrough visited Anfield on 7 November, and were on the receiving end on a 4–1 defeat in which Ronny Rosenthal scored twice. Rosenthal was the only man on the scoresheet 16 days later as the Reds beat QPR 1–0 at Loftus Road. Five days later, Liverpool's surge continued when they demolished Crystal Palace 5–0 at Anfield. They had now climbed to eighth place.

The League Cup third round replay against Sheffield United at Anfield saw them run out 3–0 victors thanks to a Steve McManaman brace and a Mike Marsh penalty. However, any remaining hopes of European glory were ended on 4 November, when they suffered a 2–0 home defeat to Spartak Moscow in the second leg of the second round.

December
Liverpool's league revival stalled in November as they won just one league matches out of four. They lost 2–1 to Everton in the Merseyside derby at Goodison Park on 7 December, though two goals from Mark Walters six days later gave them a 2–1 home win over Blackburn Rovers. Six days before Christmas, however, the Reds were on the receiving end of one of the biggest league shocks of the season as they were crushed 5–1 by Coventry at Highfield Road. Their final action of 1992 came on 28 December, when they drew 1–1 at home to Manchester City. They had now slipped to 11th place.

December also saw the end of Liverpool's attempt to win a record fifth League Cup, as they were beaten 2–1 by Crystal Palace in the fourth round replay after a 1–1 draw in the first match.

January
1993 began with a 2–2 draw with Bolton Wanderers in the FA Cup third round at Burnden Park, with the replay at Anfield 10 days later sparking arguably the biggest cup upset of the season as the Reds lost 2–0 at home to the Division Two promotion chasers.

Liverpool fared little better in the league this month, beginning with a 2–1 home defeat to title chasers Aston Villa, followed by a 2–0 defeat at Wimbledon, before a John Barnes penalty against Arsenal at Highbury on 31 January, ensured that the month would not end winless for the Reds, who were still only 12th in the league.

February
Liverpool's dismal form continued into February as they failed to win a single game all month, and speculation was mounting that manager Graeme Souness would soon be forced out of the club. The month began with goalless draws against Forest and Chelsea, before the Reds lost 2–1 at Southampton. A goalless draw followed at home to Ipswich, whose recent surge in form had seen them look like outsiders for the league title a season after promotion. A 1–1 draw at Sheffield Wednesday ensured that Liverpool had gone a whole month with five games but no wins. They had managed just two goals all month, both from Don Hutchison.

March
Liverpool's action for March kicked off with a 2–1 home defeat by a Manchester United side who went top on their way to their first top division title since 1967, with left Liverpool a lowly 15th in the league and just five places and three points clear of the relegation zone. The game also saw Ian Rush score his first league goal of 1993 and only his fourth of the whole season in the league, and marked the start of a turnaround in fortunes for both player and club.

Four days later, QPR were the visitors at Anfield as Rush was the only man on the scoresheet in a 1–0 win for the hosts. Three days later, Rush was joined by Don Hutchison on the scoresheet as the Reds won 2–1 at Middlesbrough – a result which pushed the Ayresome Park club deeper into relegation trouble. 20 March, was the day of the second Merseyside derby of the season, in which Liverpool ran out 1–0 winners and Ronny Rosenthal scored the only goal of the game. The resurgence was put on hold when Liverpool's last game of the month saw the held to a 1–1 draw at relegation-threatened Crystal Palace, but Rush was on target for the fourth time in five games and his team had now lifted themselves to 10th place.

April
April began badly for the Reds as a 4–1 defeat at Blackburn (managed by former Liverpool player and boss Kenny Dalglish) suggested that another decline was setting in and that the Reds could be sucked back into the unthinkable relegation battle. However, a week later their resurgence was resumed with Ian Rush once again the inspiration as they defeated Oldham 1–0 at Anfield. Rush was on the scoresheet yet again in the next game as they were held to a 1–1 draw by Manchester City at Maine Road. Undoubtedly the best game of the month came on 17 April, when the Reds demolished Coventry 4–0 at Anfield, with Mark Walters scoring a hat-trick and defender David Burrows scoring the other goal. The month ended with a 2–0 home win over Leeds that completed Liverpool's impressive rise from 15th place to fifth within the space of a few weeks. The relegation fear was now long gone, though it was too late for Liverpool to make a challenge for one of the two UEFA Cup places.

May
With the pressure off the Reds as the end of the season loomed, they lost 1–0 to third placed Norwich at the beginning of the month before being beaten 3–2 by an Oldham side who were on the way to completing a survival act which was little short of miraculous. The campaign ended on 8 May, with an impressive 6–2 demolition of Tottenham with goals from Ian Rush (twice), John Barnes (twice), a penalty from Mark Walters and an own goal from Tottenham's Stuart Nethercott, to secure a sixth-place finish for the second season running.  Manager Souness was not at the game, instead attending the match between Coventry City and Leeds United in order to scout Coventry forward Peter Ndlovu.

Statistics

Top scorers

Notes

References

External links
LFC History 1992–93 Season

Liverpool F.C. seasons
Liverpool F.C.